Helianthus californicus is a North American species of sunflower known by the common name California sunflower. It is native to California in the United States and Baja California in Mexico, where it grows in many types of habitats.

Helianthus californicus is an erect perennial herb growing from a network of tough, woody roots with small rhizomes. It is a sprawling, gangly plant, sending a thin stem to heights between one and three meters (3–10 feet) or more. The lance-shaped leaves may be 20 centimeters (8 inches) long and are smooth or slightly toothed along the edges. The inflorescence holds several flower heads. Each head is supported by a base covered in long, pointed phyllaries that bend back as the head ages and develops fruit.

References

External links
Jepson Manual Treatment
United States Department of Agriculture Plants Profile
Calphotos Photo gallery, University of California

Flora of California
Flora of Baja California
californicus
Plants described in 1836